Eustathes celebensis is a species of beetle in the family Cerambycidae. It was described by Chemin in 2011. It is known from Sulawesi.

References

Astathini
Beetles described in 2011